The following is a list of Iona Gaels men's basketball head coaches. There have been 14 head coaches of the Gaels in their 80-season history.

Iona's current head coach is Rick Pitino. He was hired as the Gaels' head coach in March 2020, replacing Tim Cluess, who resigned due to health concerns after the 2019–20 season.

References

Iona

Iona Gaels basketball, men's, coaches